The Great Southwest Building, formerly the Petroleum Building, is a skyscraper located at 1314 Texas Avenue in Downtown Houston, Texas in the United States.

History
The structure was originally commissioned by Joseph S. Cullinan founder of The Texas Company to house the offices of his growing oil and gas business. Designed by New York Architect Alfred Bossom, the building features Art Deco styling with unusual Mayan touches including reliefs and a stepped back style on upper floors to mimic a Mayan pyramid. This Mayan influenced design would be re-imagined 50 years later with the similarly styled Heritage Plaza building finished in 1987.

Tenants
After Texaco relocated to larger offices, the building continued to serve smaller oil and gas companies on upper floors and retail outlets on the ground floor. In 2015, a Dallas based developer Todd Interests purchased the structure with plans to renovate the building and create 150 luxury apartment units. The project will receive a 15,000 tax credit per unit from the Houston Downtown Living Initiative, a program designed to encourage residential development in the city center.

The building is now the site of Cambria Hotel Downtown Convention Center.

See also

Heritage Plaza

References

External links

1927 establishments in Texas
Office buildings completed in 1927
Skyscraper office buildings in Houston
Buildings and structures in Houston